Lisa Marie Beare (born 1975 or 1976) is a Canadian politician, who was elected to the Legislative Assembly of British Columbia in the 2017 provincial election. She represents the electoral district of Maple Ridge-Pitt Meadows as a member of the British Columbia New Democratic Party caucus.

She previously served as a Maple Ridge school board trustee and as vice-president of CUPE 4078.  On November 26, 2020 John Horgan announced she will be the Minister of Citizens' Services.

Early life and education
Beare was born and raised in Maple Ridge, British Columbia. She attended Thomas Haney Secondary School and earned a diploma in local government management from the University of Victoria before starting her career as a flight attendant for Air Transat.

Career
In 2014, Beare was elected a Maple Ridge school board trustee with 6,433 votes. Two years later, she announced her decision to run for Maple Ridge-Pitt Meadows in BC's next election.

In 2017, Beare was elected to the Legislative Assembly of British Columbia in the 2017 provincial election. In the incoming Horgan ministry, she was named Minister of Tourism, Arts and Culture. The following year, she was diagnosed with a medical condition affecting her heart which required surgery.  She was re-elected in the 2020 election, after which she was named the Minister of Citizens' Services. On September 28, 2022, after Tourism Minister Melanie Mark stepped down from cabinet due to medical reasons, Beare took over responsibility for the tourism portfolio in addition to her work in citizens' services.

Electoral record

References

21st-century Canadian politicians
21st-century Canadian women politicians
British Columbia New Democratic Party MLAs
British Columbia school board members
Canadian Union of Public Employees people
Canadian women trade unionists
Flight attendants
Living people
Members of the Executive Council of British Columbia
Trade unionists from British Columbia
University of Victoria alumni
Women government ministers of Canada
Women MLAs in British Columbia
Year of birth missing (living people)